The World's Columbian Exposition (also known as the Chicago World's Fair) was a world's fair held in Chicago in 1893 to celebrate the 400th anniversary of Christopher Columbus's arrival in the New World in 1492. The centerpiece of the Fair, held in Jackson Park, was a large water pool representing the voyage Columbus took to the New World. Chicago had won the right to host the fair over several other cities, including New York City, Washington, D.C., and St. Louis. The exposition was an influential social and cultural event and had a profound effect on American architecture, the arts, American industrial optimism, and Chicago's image.

The layout of the Chicago Columbian Exposition was, in large part, designed by John Wellborn Root, Daniel Burnham, Frederick Law Olmsted, and Charles B. Atwood. It was the prototype of what Burnham and his colleagues thought a city should be. It was designed to follow Beaux-Arts principles of design, namely neoclassical architecture principles based on symmetry, balance, and splendor. The color of the material generally used to cover the buildings' façades (white staff) gave the fairgrounds its nickname, the White City.  Many prominent architects designed its 14 "great buildings". Artists and musicians were featured in exhibits and many also made depictions and works of art inspired by the exposition.

The exposition covered , featuring nearly 200 new (but deliberately temporary) buildings of predominantly neoclassical architecture, canals and lagoons, and people and cultures from 46 countries. More than 27 million people attended the exposition during its six-month run. Its scale and grandeur far exceeded the other world's fairs, and it became a symbol of emerging American exceptionalism, much in the same way that the Great Exhibition became a symbol of the Victorian era United Kingdom.

Dedication ceremonies for the fair were held on October 21, 1892, but the fairgrounds were not actually opened to the public until May 1, 1893. The fair continued until October 30, 1893. In addition to recognizing the 400th anniversary of the discovery of the New World by Europeans, the fair also served to show the world that Chicago had risen from the ashes of the Great Chicago Fire, which had destroyed much of the city in 1871.

On October 9, 1893, the day designated as Chicago Day, the fair set a world record for outdoor event attendance, drawing 751,026 people. The debt for the fair was soon paid off with a check for $1.5 million (equivalent to $ in ). Chicago has commemorated the fair with one of the stars on its municipal flag.

History

Planning and organization

Many prominent civic, professional, and commercial leaders from around the United States participated in the financing, coordination, and management of the Fair, including Chicago shoe company owner Charles H. Schwab, Chicago railroad and manufacturing magnate John Whitfield Bunn, and Connecticut banking, insurance, and iron products magnate Milo Barnum Richardson, among many others.

The fair was planned in the early 1890s during the Gilded Age of rapid industrial growth, immigration, and class tension. World's fairs, such as London's 1851 Crystal Palace Exhibition, had been successful in Europe as a way to bring together societies fragmented along class lines.

The first American attempt at a world's fair in Philadelphia in 1876 drew crowds, but was a financial failure. Nonetheless, ideas about distinguishing the 400th anniversary of Columbus' landing started in the late 1880s. Civic leaders in St. Louis, New York City, Washington DC, and Chicago expressed interest in hosting a fair to generate profits, boost real estate values, and promote their cities. Congress was called on to decide the location. New York financiers J. P. Morgan, Cornelius Vanderbilt, and William Waldorf Astor, among others, pledged $15 million to finance the fair if Congress awarded it to New York, while Chicagoans Charles T. Yerkes, Marshall Field, Philip Armour, Gustavus Swift, and Cyrus McCormick, Jr., offered to finance a Chicago fair. What finally persuaded Congress was Chicago banker Lyman Gage, who raised several million additional dollars in a 24-hour period, over and above New York's final offer.

Chicago representatives not only fought for the world's fair for monetary reasons, but also for reasons of practicality. In a Senate hearing held in January 1890, representative Thomas Barbour Bryan argued that the most important qualities for a world's fair were “abundant supplies of good air and pure water,...ample space, accommodations and transportation for all exhibits and visitors...." He argued that New York had too many obstructions, and Chicago would be able to use large amounts of land around the city where there was "not a house to buy and not a rock to blast...." and that it would be so located that "the artisan and the farmer and the shopkeeper and the man of humble means" would be able to access the fair easily. Bryan continued to say that the fair was of “vital interest” to the West, and that the West wanted the location to be Chicago. The city spokesmen would continue to stress the essentials of a successful Exposition and that only Chicago was fit to fill these exposition requirements.

The location of the fair was decided through several rounds of voting by the United States House of Representatives. The first ballot showed Chicago with a large lead over New York, St. Louis, and Washington, DC, but short of a majority. Chicago broke the 154-vote majority threshold on the eighth ballot, receiving 157 votes to New York's 107.

The exposition corporation and national exposition commission settled on Jackson Park and an area around it as the fair site. Daniel H. Burnham was selected as director of works, and George R. Davis as director-general. Burnham emphasized architecture and sculpture as central to the fair and assembled the period's top talent to design the buildings and grounds including Frederick Law Olmsted for the grounds. The temporary buildings were designed in an ornate Neoclassical style and painted white, resulting in the fair site being referred to as the "White City".

The Exposition's offices set up shop in the upper floors of the Rand McNally Building on Adams Street, the world's first all-steel-framed skyscraper. Davis's team organized the exhibits with the help of G. Brown Goode of the Smithsonian. The Midway was inspired by the 1889 Paris Universal Exposition, which included ethnological "villages.”

Civil rights leaders protested the refusal to include an African-American exhibit. Frederick Douglass, Ida B. Wells, Irvine Garland Penn, and Ferdinand Lee Barnet co-authored a pamphlet entitled "The Reason Why the Colored American is not in the World's Columbian Exposition – The Afro-American's Contribution to Columbian Literature" addressing the issue. The exhibition included a number of exhibits put on by black  individuals and approved by white organizers of the fair, including exhibits by the sculptor Edmonia Lewis, a painting exhibit by scientist George Washington Carver, and a statistical exhibit by Joan Imogen Howard. It also included blacks in white exhibits, such as Nancy Green's portrayal of the character Aunt Jemima for the R. T. Davis Milling Company.

Operation 

The fair opened in May and ran through October 30, 1893.  Forty-six nations participated in the fair (it was the first world's fair to have national pavilions), constructing exhibits and pavilions and naming national "delegates" (for example, Haiti selected Frederick Douglass to be its delegate). The Exposition drew over 27 million visitors. The fair was originally meant to be closed on Sundays, but the Chicago Woman's Club petitioned that it stay open. The club felt that if the exposition was closed on Sunday, it would restrict those who could not take off work during the work-week from seeing it.

Charles H. Wacker was the director of the fair. The layout of the fairgrounds was created by Frederick Law Olmsted, and the Beaux-Arts architecture of the buildings was under the direction of Daniel Burnham, Director of Works for the fair. Renowned local architect Henry Ives Cobb designed several buildings for the exposition. The director of the American Academy in Rome, Francis Davis Millet, directed the painted mural decorations. Indeed, it was a coming-of-age for the arts and architecture of the "American Renaissance," and it showcased the burgeoning neoclassical and Beaux-Arts styles.

Assassination of mayor and end of fair

The fair ended with the city in shock, as popular mayor Carter Harrison, Sr. was assassinated by Patrick Eugene Prendergast two days before the fair's closing. Closing ceremonies were canceled in favor of a public memorial service.

Jackson Park was returned to its status as a public park, in much better shape than its original swampy form. The lagoon was reshaped to give it a more natural appearance, except for the straight-line northern end where it still laps up against the steps on the south side of the Palace of Fine Arts/Museum of Science & Industry building. The Midway Plaisance, a park-like boulevard which extends west from Jackson Park, once formed the southern boundary of the University of Chicago, which was being built as the fair was closing (the university has since developed south of the Midway). The university's football team, the Maroons, were the original "Monsters of the Midway." The exposition is mentioned in the university's alma mater: "The City White hath fled the earth,/But where the azure waters lie,/A nobler city hath its birth,/The City Gray that ne'er shall die."

Attractions 

The World's Columbian Exposition was the first world's fair with an area for amusements that was strictly separated from the exhibition halls.  This area, developed by a young music promoter, Sol Bloom, concentrated on Midway Plaisance and introduced the term "midway" to American English to describe the area of a carnival or fair where sideshows are located.

One attendee, George C. Tilyou, later credited the sights he saw on the Chicago midway for inspiring him to create America's first major amusement park, Steeplechase Park in Coney Island, New York.

The fair included life-size reproductions of Christopher Columbus' three ships, the Niña (real name Santa Clara), the Pinta, and the Santa María. These were intended to celebrate the 400th anniversary of Columbus' discovery of the Americas.  The ships, a joint project of the governments of Spain and the United States, were constructed in Spain and then sailed to America for the exposition.  The ships were a very popular exhibit.

Eadweard Muybridge gave a series of lectures on the Science of Animal Locomotion in the Zoopraxographical Hall, built specially for that purpose on Midway Plaisance. He used his zoopraxiscope to show his moving pictures to a paying public. The hall was the first commercial movie theater.

The "Street in Cairo" included the popular dancer known as Little Egypt. She introduced America to the suggestive version of the belly dance known as the "hootchy-kootchy," to a tune said to have been improvised by Sol Bloom (and now more commonly associated with snake charmers) which he had composed when his dancers had no music to dance to. Bloom did not copyright the song, putting it immediately in the public domain.

Also included was the first moving walkway or travelator, which was designed by architect Joseph Lyman Silsbee. It had two different divisions: one where passengers were seated, and one where riders could stand or walk. It ran in a loop down the length of a lakefront pier to a casino.

Although denied a spot at the fair, Buffalo Bill Cody decided to come to Chicago anyway, setting up his Buffalo Bill's Wild West Show just outside the edge of the exposition. Nearby, historian Frederick Jackson Turner gave academic lectures reflecting on the end of the frontier which Buffalo Bill represented.

The electrotachyscope of Ottomar Anschütz was demonstrated, which used a Geissler tube to project the illusion of moving images.

Louis Comfort Tiffany made his reputation with a stunning chapel designed and built for the Exposition. After the Exposition the Tiffany Chapel was sold several times, even going back to Tiffany's estate. It was eventually reconstructed and restored and in 1999 it was installed at the Charles Hosmer Morse Museum of American Art.

Architect Kirtland Cutter's Idaho Building, a rustic log construction, was a popular favorite, visited by an estimated 18 million people. The building's design and interior furnishings were a major precursor of the Arts and Crafts movement.

Among the other attractions at the fair, several products that are well-known today were introduced. These products included Juicy Fruit Gum, Cream of Wheat, Cracker Jacks, Shredded Wheat Cereal, and Pabst Blue Ribbon beer, among many others.

Anthropology
There was an Anthropology Building at the World's Fair. Nearby, "The Cliff Dwellers" featured a rock and timber structure that was painted to recreate Battle Rock Mountain in Colorado, a stylized recreation of an American Indian cliff dwelling with pottery, weapons, and other relics on display. There was also an Eskimo display. There were also birch bark wigwams of the Penobscot tribe. Nearby was a working model Indian school, organized by the Office of Indian Affairs, that housed delegations of Native American students and their teachers from schools around the country for weeks at a time.

Rail
The John Bull locomotive was displayed. It was only 62 years old, having been built in 1831. It was the first locomotive acquisition by the Smithsonian Institution. The locomotive ran under its own power from Washington, DC, to Chicago to participate, and returned to Washington under its own power again when the exposition closed. In 1981 it was the oldest surviving operable steam locomotive in the world when it ran under its own power again.

A Baldwin 2-4-2 locomotive was showcased at the exposition, and subsequently the  type was known as the Columbia.

An original frog switch and portion of the superstructure of the famous 1826 Granite Railway in Massachusetts could be viewed. This was the first commercial railroad in the United States to evolve into a common carrier without an intervening closure. The railway brought granite stones from a rock quarry in Quincy, Massachusetts, so that the Bunker Hill Monument could be erected in Boston. The frog switch is now on public view in East Milton Square, Massachusetts, on the original right-of-way of the Granite Railway.

Transportation by rail was the major mode of transportation. A 26 track train station was built at the South West corner of the fair. While trains from around the country would unload there, there was a local train to shuttle tourists from the Chicago Grand Central Station to the fair.

Country and state exhibition buildings
Forty-six countries had pavilions at the exposition. Norway participated by sending the Viking, a replica of the Gokstad ship.  It was built in Norway and sailed across the Atlantic by 12 men, led by Captain Magnus Andersen. In 1919 this ship was moved to Lincoln Park. It was relocated in 1996 to Good Templar Park in Geneva, Illinois, where it awaits renovation.

Thirty-four U.S. states also had their own pavilions. The work of noted feminist author Kate McPhelim Cleary was featured during the opening of the Nebraska Day ceremonies at the fair, which included a reading of her poem "Nebraska". Among the state buildings present at the fair were California, Connecticut, Florida, Massachusetts, New Jersey, New York, Pennsylvania, and Texas; each was meant to be architecturally representative of the corresponding states.

Four United States territories also had pavilions located in one building: Arizona, New Mexico, Oklahoma, and Utah.

Visitors to the Louisiana Pavilion were each given a seedling of a cypress tree. This resulted in the spread of cypress trees to areas where they were not native.  Cypress trees from those seedlings can be found in many areas of West Virginia, where they flourish in the climate.

The Illinois was a detailed, full-scale mockup of an Indiana-class battleship, constructed as a naval exhibit.

Guns and artillery

The German firm Krupp had a pavilion of artillery, which apparently had cost one million dollars to stage, including a coastal gun of 42 cm in bore (16.54 inches) and a length of 33 calibres (45.93 feet, 14 meters). A breech-loaded gun, it weighed 120.46 long tons (122.4 metric tons). According to the company's marketing: "It carried a charge projectile weighing from 2,200 to 2,500 pounds which, when driven by 900 pounds of brown powder, was claimed to be able to penetrate at 2,200 yards a wrought-iron plate three feet thick if placed at right angles." 

Nicknamed "The Thunderer", the gun had an advertised range of 15 miles. On this occasion John Schofield declared Krupps' guns "the greatest peacemakers in the world". This gun was later seen as a precursor of the company's World War I Dicke Berta howitzers.

Religions
The 1893 Parliament of the World's Religions, which ran from September 11 to September 27, marked the first formal gathering of representatives of Eastern and Western spiritual traditions from around the world. According to Eric J. Sharpe, Tomoko Masuzawa, and others, the event was considered radical at the time, since it allowed non-Christian faiths to speak on their own behalf. For example, it is recognized as the first public mention of the Baháʼí Faith in North America.; it was not taken seriously by European scholars until the 1960s.

Moving walkway

Along the banks of the lake, patrons on the way to the casino were taken on a moving walkway designed by architect Joseph Lyman Silsbee, the first of its kind open to the public, called The Great Wharf, Moving Sidewalk, it allowed people to walk along or ride in seats.

Horticulture
Horticultural exhibits at the Horticultural Hall included cacti and orchids as well as other plants in a greenhouse.

Architecture

White City 

Most of the buildings of the fair were designed in the neoclassical architecture style. The area at the Court of Honor was known as The White City. Façades were made not of stone, but of a mixture of plaster, cement, and jute fiber called staff, which was painted white, giving the buildings their "gleam.”  Architecture critics derided the structures as "decorated sheds.” The buildings were clad in white stucco, which, in comparison to the tenements of Chicago, seemed illuminated. It was also called the White City because of the extensive use of street lights, which made the boulevards and buildings usable at night.

In 1892, working under extremely tight deadlines to complete construction, director of works Daniel Burnham appointed Francis Davis Millet to replace the fair's official director of color-design, William Pretyman. Pretyman had resigned following a dispute with Burnham. After experimenting, Millet settled on a mix of oil and white lead whitewash that could be applied using compressed air spray painting to the buildings, taking considerably less time than traditional brush painting. Joseph Binks, maintenance supervisor at Chicago's Marshall Field's Wholesale Store, who had been using this method to apply whitewash to the subbasement walls of the store, got the job to paint the Exposition buildings. Claims this was the first use of spray painting may be apocryphal since journals from that time note this form of painting had already been in use in the railroad industry from the early 1880s.

Many of the buildings included sculptural details and, to meet the Exposition's opening deadline, chief architect Burnham sought the help of Chicago Art Institute instructor Lorado Taft to help complete them. Taft's efforts included employing a group of talented women sculptors from the Institute known as "the White Rabbits" to finish some of the buildings, getting their name from Burnham's comment "Hire anyone, even white rabbits if they'll do the work."

The words "Thine alabaster cities gleam" from the song "America the Beautiful" were inspired by the White City.

White City controversy 

According to University of Notre Dame history professor Gail Bederman, White City sparked considerable controversy. In her 1995 text Manliness and Civilization, she writes, "The White City, with its vision of future perfection and of the advanced racial power of manly commerce and technology, constructed civilization as an ideal of white male power." According to Bederman, people of color were barred entirely from participating in the organization of the White City and were instead given access only to the Midway exhibit, "which specialized in spectacles of barbarous races - 'authentic' villages of Samoans, Egyptians, Dahomans, Turks, and other exotic peoples, populated by actual imported 'natives.'"

Two small exhibits were included in the White City's "Woman's Building" which addressed women of color. One, entitled "Afro-American" was installed in a distant corner of the building.  The other, called "Woman's Work in Savagery," included baskets, weavings, and African, Polynesian, and Native American arts. Though they were produced by living women of color, the materials were represented as relics from the distant past, embodying "the work of white women's own distant evolutionary foremothers."

In response to these failings, civil rights leaders Ida B. Wells, Frederick Douglass, Irvine Garland Penn, and Ferdinand Lee Barnet wrote and circulated a pamphlet at the exposition titled The Reason Why the Colored American Is Not in the World's Columbian Exposition, which argued the exposition organizers had deliberately excluded African Americans from the White City in order "to shame the Negro." By only allowing Black people to be featured in "Midway," Wells and Douglass argued, "the Dahomians are also here to exhibit the Negro as a repulsive savage." Ten thousand copies of the pamphlet were circulated in the White City from the Haitian Embassy (where Douglass had been selected as its national representative), and the activists received responses from the delegations of England, Germany, France, Russia, and India.

Role in the City Beautiful Movement 

The White City is largely credited for ushering in the City Beautiful movement and planting the seeds of modern city planning.  The highly integrated design of the landscapes, promenades, and structures provided a vision of what is possible when planners, landscape architects, and architects work together on a comprehensive design scheme.

The White City inspired cities to focus on the beautification of the components of the city in which municipal government had control; streets, municipal art, public buildings, and public spaces. The designs of the City Beautiful Movement (closely tied with the municipal art movement) are identifiable by their classical architecture, plan symmetry, picturesque views, and axial plans, as well as their magnificent scale.  Where the municipal art movement focused on beautifying one feature in a city, the City Beautiful movement began to make improvements on the scale of the district. The White City of the World's Columbian Exposition inspired the Merchants Club of Chicago to commission Daniel Burnham to create the Plan of Chicago in 1909.

Great buildings

There were fourteen main "great buildings" centered around a giant reflective pool called the Grand Basin. Buildings included:
 The Administration Building, designed by Richard Morris Hunt
 The Agricultural Building, designed by Charles McKim of McKim, Mead & White
 The Manufactures and Liberal Arts Building, designed by George B. Post. If this building were standing today, it would rank second in volume (8,500,000m3) and third in footprint (130,000m2) on list of largest buildings. It exhibited works related to literature, science, art and music.
 The Mines and Mining Building, designed by Solon Spencer Beman
 The Electricity Building, designed by Henry Van Brunt and Frank Maynard Howe
 The Machinery Hall, designed by Robert Swain Peabody of Peabody and Stearns
 The Woman's Building, designed by Sophia Hayden
 The Transportation Building, designed by Adler & Sullivan
 The Fisheries Building designed by Henry Ives Cobb
 Forestry Building designed by Charles B. Atwood
 Horticultural Building designed by Jenney and Mundie
 Anthropology Building designed by Charles B. Atwood

Transportation Building

Louis Sullivan's polychrome proto-Modern Transportation Building was an outstanding exception to the prevailing style, as he tried to develop an organic American form. Years later, in 1922, he wrote that the classical style of the White City had set back modern American architecture by forty years.

As detailed in Erik Larson's popular history The Devil in the White City, extraordinary effort was required to accomplish the exposition, and much of it was unfinished on opening day. The famous Ferris Wheel, which proved to be a major attendance draw and helped save the fair from bankruptcy, was not finished until June, because of waffling by the board of directors the previous year on whether to build it. Frequent debates and disagreements among the developers of the fair added many delays. The spurning of Buffalo Bill's Wild West Show proved a serious financial mistake.  Buffalo Bill set up his highly popular show next door to the fair and brought in a great deal of revenue that he did not have to share with the developers. Nonetheless, construction and operation of the fair proved to be a windfall for Chicago workers during the serious economic recession that was sweeping the country.

Surviving structures

Almost all of the fair's structures were designed to be temporary; of the more than 200 buildings erected for the fair, the only two which still stand in place are the Palace of Fine Arts and the World's Congress Auxiliary Building. From the time the fair closed until 1920, the Palace of Fine Arts housed the Field Columbian Museum (now the Field Museum of Natural History, since relocated); in 1933 (having been completely rebuilt in permanent materials), the Palace building re-opened as the Museum of Science and Industry.  The second building, the World's Congress Building, was one of the few buildings not built in Jackson Park, instead it was built downtown in Grant Park. The cost of construction of the World's Congress Building was shared with the Art Institute of Chicago, which, as planned, moved into the building (the museum's current home) after the close of the fair.

The three other significant buildings that survived the fair represented Norway, the Netherlands, and the State of Maine. The Norway Building was a recreation of a traditional wooden stave church. After the Fair it was relocated to Lake Geneva, and in 1935 was moved to a museum called Little Norway in Blue Mounds, Wisconsin. In 2015 it was dismantled and shipped back to Norway, where it was restored and reassembled. The second is the Maine State Building, designed by Charles Sumner Frost, which was purchased by the Ricker family of Poland Spring, Maine. They moved the building to their resort to serve as a library and art gallery. The Poland Spring Preservation Society now owns the building, which was listed on the National Register of Historic Places in 1974. The third is The Dutch House, which was moved to Brookline, Massachusetts.

The 1893 Viking ship that was sailed to the Exposition from Norway by Captain Magnus Andersen, is located in Geneva, Illinois. The ship is open to visitors on scheduled days April through October.

The main altar at St. John Cantius in Chicago, as well as its matching two side altars, are reputed to be from the Columbian Exposition.

Since many of the other buildings at the fair were intended to be temporary, they were removed after the fair. The White City so impressed visitors (at least before air pollution began to darken the façades) that plans were considered to refinish the exteriors in marble or some other material. These plans were abandoned in July 1894, when much of the fair grounds was destroyed in a fire.

Gallery

Criticism

Frank Lloyd Wright later wrote that "By this overwhelming rise of grandomania I was confirmed in my fear that a native architecture would be set back at least fifty years.

Visitors
Helen Keller, along with her mentor Anne Sullivan and Dr. Alexander Graham Bell, visited the fair in summer of 1893. Keller described the fair in her autobiography The Story of My Life. Early in July, a Wellesley College English teacher named Katharine Lee Bates visited the fair. The White City later inspired the reference to "alabaster cities" in her poem and lyrics "America the Beautiful". The exposition was extensively reported by Chicago publisher William D. Boyce's reporters and artists. There is a very detailed and vivid description of all facets of this fair by the Persian traveler Mirza Mohammad Ali Mo'in ol-Saltaneh written in Persian. He departed from Persia on April 20, 1892, especially for the purpose of visiting the World's Columbian Exposition. 

Pierre de Coubertin visited the fair with his friends Paul Bourget and Samuel Jean de Pozzi. He devotes the first chapter of his book " Souvenirs d'Amérique et de Grèce " (1897) to the visit. Swami Vivekananda visited the fair to attend the Parliament of the World's Religions and delivered his famous speech "Sisters and Brothers of America!". Kubota Beisen was an official delegate of Japan. As an artist, he sketched hundreds of scenes, some of which were later used to make woodblock print books about the Exhibition. Serial killer H. H. Holmes attended the fair with two of his eventual victims, Annie and Minnie Williams.

Souvenirs

Examples of exposition souvenirs can be found in various American museum collections.  One example, copyrighted in 1892 by John W. Green, is a folding hand fan with detailed illustrations of landscapes and architecture. Charles W Goldsmith produced a set of ten postcard designs, each in full colour, showing the buildings constructed for the exhibition. Columbian Exposition coins were also minted for the event.

Electricity 

The effort to power the Fair with electricity, which became a demonstration piece for Westinghouse Electric and the alternating current system they had been developing for many years, took place at the end of what has been called the War of the currents between DC and AC. Westinghouse initially did not put in a bid to power the Fair but agreed to be the contractor for a local Chicago company that put in a low bid of US$510,000 to supply an alternating current based system. 

Edison General Electric, which at the time was merging with the Thomson-Houston Electric Company to form General Electric, put in a US$1.72 million bid to power the Fair and its planned 93,000 incandescent lamps with direct current. After the Fair committee went over both proposals, Edison General Electric re-bid their costs at $554,000 but Westinghouse under bid them by 70 cents per lamp to get the contract. Westinghouse could not use the Edison incandescent lamp since the patent belonged to General Electric and they had successfully sued to stop use of all patent infringing designs. Since Edison specified a sealed globe of glass in his design Westinghouse found a way to sidestep the Edison patent by quickly developing a lamp with a ground glass stopper in one end, based on a Sawyer-Man "stopper" lamp patent they already had. The lamps worked well but were short lived, requiring a small army of workmen to constantly replace them. 

Westinghouse Electric had severely underbid the contract and struggled to supply all the equipment specified including twelve 1,000 horsepower single phase AC generators and all the lighting and other equipment required. They also had to fend off a last minute lawsuit by General Electric claiming the Westinghouse Sawyer-Man based stopper lamp infringed on the Edison incandescent lamp patent.

The International Exposition was held in an Electricity Building which was devoted to electrical exhibits. A statue of Benjamin Franklin was displayed at the entrance. The exposition featured interior and exterior light and displays as well as displays of Thomas Edison's kinetoscope, search lights, a seismograph, electric incubators for chicken eggs, and Morse code telegraph.

All the exhibits were from commercial enterprises. Participants included General Electric, Brush, Western Electric, and Westinghouse. The Westinghouse Company displayed several polyphase systems. The exhibits included a switchboard, polyphase generators, step-up transformers, transmission line, step-down transformers, commercial size induction motors and synchronous motors, and rotary direct current converters (including an operational railway motor). The working scaled system allowed the public a view of a system of polyphase power which could be transmitted over long distances, and be utilized, including the supply of direct current. Meters and other auxiliary devices were also present.

Part of the space occupied by the Westinghouse Company was devoted to demonstrations of electrical devices developed by Nikola Tesla including induction motors and the generators used to power the system. The rotating magnetic field that drove these motors was explained through a series of demonstrations including an Egg of Columbus that used the two-phase coil in the induction motors to spin a copper egg making it stand on end.

Tesla himself showed up for a week in August to attend the International Electrical Congress, being held at the fair's Agriculture Hall, and put on a series of demonstrations of his wireless lighting system in a specially set up darkened room at the Westinghouse exhibit. These included demonstrations he had previously performed throughout America and Europe including using a nearby coil to light a wireless gas-discharge lamp held in his hand.

Also at the Fair, the Chicago Athletic Association Football team played one of the first night football games against West Point (the earliest being on September 28, 1892, between Mansfield State Normal and Wyoming Seminary). Chicago won the game 14–0. The game lasted only 40 minutes, compared to the normal 90 minutes.

Music

Musicians 

 John Philip Sousa′s Band played for the Exposition dedication celebration in Chicago, 10 October through 21 October 1892.
 Joseph Douglass, classical violinist, who achieved wide recognition after his performance there and became the first African-American violinist to conduct a transcontinental tour and the first to tour as a concert violinist.
 Sissieretta Jones, a soprano known as "the Black Patti" and an already-famous opera singer.
 A paper on African-American spirituals and shouts by Abigail Christensen was read to attendees.

There were many other black artists at the fair, ranging from minstrel and early ragtime groups to more formal classical ensembles to street buskers.
Scott Joplin, pianist, from Texarkana, Texas; became widely known for his piano playing at the fair.

Other music and musicians 

 The first Indonesian music performance in the United States was at the exposition. The gamelan instruments used in the performance were later placed in the Field Museum of Natural History.
 A group of hula dancers led to increased awareness of Hawaiian music among Americans throughout the country.
 Stoughton Musical Society, the oldest choral society in the United States, presented the first concerts of early American music at the exposition.
 The first eisteddfod (a Welsh choral competition with a history spanning many centuries) held outside Wales was held in Chicago at the exposition.
 A 250-voice Mormon Tabernacle Choir competed in the Eisteddfod taking the second place prize of $1000.  This was the first appearance of the Choir outside the Utah Territory.
 August 12, 1893 – Antonín Dvořák conducted a gala "Bohemian Day" concert at the exposition, besieged by visitors including the conductor of the Chicago Symphony, who arranged for performance of Dvořák's American string quartet, just completed in Spillville, Iowa, during a Dvořák family vacation in a Czech-speaking community there.
 American composer Amy Beach (1867–1944) was commissioned by the Board of Lady Managers of the fair to compose a choral work (Festival Jubilate, op. 17) for the opening of the Woman's Building.
Sousa's Band played concerts in the south bandstand on the Great Plaza, 25 May to 28 June 1893.
The University of Illinois Military Band conducted by student leaders Charles Elder and Richard Sharpe played concerts twice daily in the Illinois Building 9 June to 24 June 1893. Soloists were William Sandford, euphonium; Charles Elder, clarinet; William Steele, cornet. The band members slept on cots on the top floor of the building.
8 June 1893 — The Exposition Orchestra, an expanded version of the Chicago Symphony conducted by guest conductor Vojtěch I. Hlaváč, played the American premiere of Modest Mussorgsky's A Night on Bald Mountain as part of a concert of Russian folk music.
A pipe organ containing over 3,900 pipes, one of the largest in the world at the time, was built by the Farrand & Votey Organ Company to the specifications of Chicago organist Clarence Eddy. It was one of the first great organs to rely on electrical connections from its keys to its pipes.
Musicologist Anna Morsch and composer Charlotte Sporleder presented a program of German music.
Composer and pianist Anita Socola Specht won the title “best amateur pianist in the United States,” although some of the judges told her, “You are not an amateur, you are an artist!”

Art

American artists exhibiting

Painters

 Adam Emory Albright
 Henry Alexander
 Maitland Armstrong
 William Jacob Baer
 William Bliss Baker
 Cecilia Beaux
 James Carroll Beckwith
 Enella Benedict 
 Frank Weston Benson
 Daniel Folger Bigelow  
 Ralph Albert Blakelock 
 Edwin Howland Blashfield   
 Mary Cassatt
Sarah Paxton Ball Dodson
Thomas Eakins
Charles Morgan McIlhenney 
Gari Melchers
Anna Lea Merritt
John Harrison Mills 
Robert Crannell Minor 
Louis Moeller
Harry Humphrey Moore 
Edward Moran
 John Singer Sargent

Sculptors
 Sarah Fisher Ames, sculptor
 John J. Boyle sculptor 
 Cyrus Edwin Dallin, sculptor – Signal of Peace
 Charles Grafly – Bust of Daedalus
Mary Lawrence, sculptor
Edward Kemeys
Theo Alice Ruggles Kitson (as Theo Alice Ruggles)
Aloys Loeher
Carol Brooks MacNeil (as Caroline Brooks)
Helen Farnsworth Mears
Samuel Murray – Bust of Walt Whitman
William Rudolf O'Donovan – Bust of Thomas Eakins
 Bessie Potter
Peter Moran
George D. Peterson
Preston Powers
Katherine Prescott 
 A. Phimister Proctor
 John Rogers
 Carl Rohl-Smith
 Lorado Taft
 Douglas Tilden
 Luella Varney

Japanese art
Japan's artistic contribution was mainly in porcelain, cloisonné enamel, metalwork and embroidery. While 55 paintings and 24 sculptures came from Japan, 271 of the 290 exhibits in the Palace of Fine Arts were Japanese. Artists represented included Miyagawa Kozan, Yabu Meizan, Namikawa Sōsuke, and Suzuki Chokichi.

Women artists exhibiting

The women artists at the Woman's Building included Anna Lownes,
Viennese painter Rosa Schweninger, and many others. American composer Amy Cheney Beach was commissioned by the Board of Lady Managers of the fair to compose a choral work (Festival Jubilate, op. 17) for the opening of the Woman's Building. The Mrs Potts sad-iron system was on display. Ami Mali Hicks' stencil design was selected to adorn the frieze in the assembly room of the Women's Building. Musicologist Anna Morsch and composer Charlotte Sporleder presented a program of German music.

The Woman's Building included a Woman's Building Library Exhibit, which had 7,000 books — all by women. The Woman's Building Library was meant to show the cumulative contribution of the world's women to literature.

"Greatest Refrigerator on Earth" fire tragedy 
In the large 255' X 130' Romanesque structure standing almost 200' tall at its highest point, housing both the cold storage for keeping perishables for the food services at the event, and an ice-skating rink for patrons at the level above the cold storage, and referred to as the "Greatest Refrigerator on Earth"; underdeveloped safety standards where high-temperature heat sources from machinery is believed to have ignited wooden structure in the building interior, causing the massive fire that caused the deaths of 12 firemen and 4 workers.

Notable firsts

Concepts

 Frederick Jackson Turner lectured on his Frontier thesis. 
 The Pledge of Allegiance was first performed at the exposition by a mass of school children lined up in military fashion.
 Contribution to Chicago's nickname, the "Windy City".  Some argue that Charles Anderson Dana of the New York Sun coined the term related to the hype of the city's promoters. Other evidence, however, suggests the term was used as early as 1881 in relation to either Chicago's "windbag" politicians or to its weather.

Commemorations
 United States Mint offered its first commemorative coins: the Columbian Exposition quarter dollar and Columbian Exposition half dollar
 The United States Post Office Department produced its first picture postcards and Commemorative stamp set

Edibles and potables
 Cream of Wheat
 The brownie was invented by Bertha Palmer for the 1893 World's Columbian Exposition.
 Milton Hershey bought a European exhibitor's chocolate manufacturing equipment and added chocolate products to his caramel manufacturing business.
 Juicy Fruit gum 
 Quaker Oats
 Shredded Wheat 
 Pabst Blue Ribbon
 Peanut butter
 Aunt Jemima pancake mix was widely popularized by spokesperson Nancy Green's pancake cooking and story telling performances.
 Cracker Jack's new recipe was introduced at the Exposition
 Vienna Sausage started selling its frankfurters and sausages near one of the entrances to the Midway Plaisance, just outside the Old Vienna Village. The company later became known as Vienna Beef, famously recognized as "Chicago's Hot Dog".

Inventions and manufacturing advances

 A device that made plates for printing books in Braille, unveiled by Frank Haven Hall, who met Helen Keller and her teacher Anne Sullivan at the exhibit.
 Moving walkway, or travelator 
 The third rail giving electric power to elevated trains led directly to its first continuing US use.
 The "clasp locker," a clumsy slide fastener and forerunner to the zipper was demonstrated by Whitcomb L. Judson
 Elongated coins (the squashed penny)
 Ferris Wheel
 First fully electrical kitchen including an automatic dishwasher
 Phosphorescent lamps (a precursor to fluorescent lamps)
 John T. Shayne & Company, the local Chicago furrier helped America gain respect on the world stage of manufacturing
 Clark cell as a standard for measuring voltage
 A first prototype of a pressurized aerosol spray, by Francis Davis Millet.
 The first practical electric automobile, invented by William Morrison.

Organizations
 Congress of Mathematicians, precursor to International Congress of Mathematicians
 Interfaith dialogue (the Parliament of the World's Religions)
 First recorded public mention of the Baháʼí Faith in North America

Performances
 The poet and humorist Benjamin Franklin King, Jr. first performed at the exposition.
 Bodybuilder Eugen Sandow demonstrated feats of strength, promoted by Florenz Ziegfeld.
 Magician Harry Houdini and his brother Theodore performed their magic act at the Midway.

Later years 

The exposition was one influence leading to the rise of the City Beautiful movement. Results included grand buildings and fountains built around Olmstedian parks, shallow pools of water on axis to central buildings, larger park systems, broad boulevards and parkways and, after the start of the 20th century, zoning laws and planned suburbs.  Examples of the City Beautiful movement's works include the City of Chicago, the Columbia University campus, and the National Mall in Washington D.C.

After the fair closed, J.C. Rogers, a banker from Wamego, Kansas, purchased several pieces of art that had hung in the rotunda of the U.S. Government Building.  He also purchased architectural elements, artifacts and buildings from the fair.  He shipped his purchases to Wamego.  Many of the items, including the artwork, were used to decorate his theater, now known as the Columbian Theatre.

Memorabilia saved by visitors can still be purchased. Numerous books, tokens, published photographs, and well-printed admission tickets can be found.  While the higher value commemorative stamps are expensive, the lower ones are quite common.  So too are the commemorative half dollars, many of which went into circulation.

Although not available for purchase, The George Washington University maintains a small collection of exposition tickets for viewing and research purposes.  The collection is currently cared for by GWU's Special Collections Research Center, located in the Estelle and Melvin Gelman Library.

When the exposition ended the Ferris Wheel was moved to Chicago's north side, next to an exclusive neighborhood. An unsuccessful Circuit Court action was filed against the owners of the wheel to have it moved. The wheel stayed there until it was moved to St. Louis for the 1904 World's Fair.

The Columbian Exposition has celebrated many anniversaries since the fair in 1893. The Chicago Historical Society held an exhibition to commemorate the fair. The Grand Illusions exhibition was centered around the idea that the Columbian Exposition was made up of a series of illusions. The commemorative exhibition contained partial reconstructions, a video detailing the fair, and a catalogue similar to the one sold at the World's Fair of 1893.

In popular culture 
 The Exposition is portrayed in the 2017 historical film, The Current War, concerning the competition between George Westinghouse and Thomas Edison to establish the dominant form of electricity in the United States.  
 1893: A World's Fair Mystery, an interactive fiction by Peter Nepstad that recreates the Exposition in detail.
 Against the Day, a fictional novel that takes place during the Exposition during the first act.
 The Devil in the White City, a non-fiction book intertwining the true tales of the architect behind the Exposition and serial killer H. H. Holmes.
 Timebound, a time travel novel by Rysa Walker, culminates at the Exposition.
 Expo: Magic of the White City, a 2005 documentary film about the Exposition by Mark Bussler.
 Jimmy Corrigan, the Smartest Kid on Earth, a graphic novel set in part at the Exposition
 Wonder of the Worlds, an adventure novel where Nikola Tesla, Mark Twain, and Houdini pursue Martian agents who have stolen a powerful crystal from Tesla at the Exposition.
 The Will of an Eccentric, an adventure novel by Jules Verne. The Exposition is evoked with admiration in the early chapters.
The Exposition appears in the season 1 episode "The World's Columbian Exposition" of the NBC series Timeless.
The Exposition is referenced in Sufjan Stevens's song in his album Illinois, "Come On! Feel The Illinoise!", which consists of two parts. Part 1 is titled, "World's Columbian Exposition".
The Exposition plays a role in the historical novel, Owen Glen, by Ben Ames Williams.
 BioShock Infinite, a 2013 video game. The floating city-state of Columbia was created at the Exposition and toured across the world to promote American exceptionalism.
 The exposition is a key setting of the novel The City Beautiful by Aden Polydoros.
The exposition appears in the travel book by Aleko Konstantinov, "To Chicago and Back".
The young adult novel "Fair Weather" by Illinois native author Richard Peck takes thirteen-year-old Rosie Beckett and her family from their downstate family farm to the 1893 World's Fair in Chicago.

See also 

 Signal of Peace
 Kwanusila
 List of world expositions
 List of world's fairs
 Benjamin W. Kilburn, stereoscopic view concession
 H. H. Holmes, serial killer associated with the 1893 World's Fair
 St. John Cantius Church (Chicago), whose main altar, as well as its matching two side altars, reputedly originate from the 1893 Columbian Exposition
 Spectacle Reef Light
 World's Largest Stove
 World's Largest Cedar Bucket
 Fairy lamp, candle sets popularized at Queen Victoria's Golden Jubilee were used to illuminate an island at the Expo
 St. Louis Autumnal Festival Association

Notes

References 

 The project documenting The World's Columbian Exposition of 1893 – Website main page, About the project
 
 
 
 
 Neuberger, Mary. 2006. "To Chicago and Back: Alecko Konstantinov, Rose Oil, and the Smell of Modernity" in Slavic Review, Fall 2006.
 Larson, Erik. The Devil in the White City: Murder, Magic, and Madness at the Fair That Changed America. New York: Vintage Books a Division of Random House, Inc., 2003.
 Ramsland, Katherine. “H. H. Holmes: Master of Illusion”. crime library. 2014. October 1, 2014. 
 Redman, Samuel J. Bone Rooms: From Scientific Racism to Human Prehistory in Museums. Cambridge: Harvard University Press. 2016. 
 Placko, Dane. “Chilling Tour inside Serial Killer H. H. Holmes’ ‘Murder Castle’”. My Fox Chicago. Apr. 28, 2014. Oct 2, 2014.
 French, Leanne; Grimm, Laura; Pak, Eudie. “H. H. Holmes Biography”. Biography. 2014. October 1, 2014.
 French, Leanne; Grimm, Laura; Pak, Eudie. H. H. Holmes – The World Fair. Television clip. Biography. 2014. A&E Television Networks, LLC, 2014. Video from biography.com.
 French, Leanne; Grimm, Laura; Pak, Eudie. H. H. Holmes – Chicago Expansion. Television clip. Biography. 2014. A&E Television Networks, LLC, 2014. Video from biography.com.
 French, Leanne; Grimm, Laura; Pak, Eudie. H. H. Holmes – Finding the Victims. Television Clip. Biography. 2014. A&E Television Networks, LLC, 2014. Video from biography.com.
 French, Leanne; Grimm, Laura; Pak, Eudie. H. H. Holmes – Full Biography. Television clip. Biography. 2014. A&E Television Networks, LLC, 2014. Video from biography.com.

Further reading 

 Appelbaum, Stanley (1980). The Chicago World's Fair of 1893. New York: Dover Publications, Inc. 
 Arnold, C.D. Portfolio of Views: The World's Columbian Exposition. National Chemigraph Company, Chicago & St. Louis, 1893.
 Bancroft, Hubert Howe. The Book of the Fair: An Historical and Descriptive Presentation of the World's Science, Art and Industry, As Viewed through the Columbian Exposition at Chicago in 1893. New York: Bounty, 1894.
 Barrett, John Patrick, Electricity at the Columbian Exposition. R.R. Donnelley, 1894.

 Bertuca, David, ed. World's Columbian Exposition: A Centennial Bibliographic Guide. Westport, CT: Greenwood Press, 1996. 
 Buel, James William. The Magic City.  New York: Arno Press, 1974. 
 Burg, David F. Chicago's White City of 1893. Lexington, KY: The University Press of Kentucky, 1976. 
 Corn, Wanda M. Women Building History: Public Art at the 1893 Columbian Exposition. Berkeley, CA: University of California Press, 2011.
 Dybwad, G. L., and Joy V. Bliss, Annotated Bibliography: World's Columbian Exposition, Chicago 1893. Book Stops Here, 1992. 
 Eagle, Mary Kavanaugh Oldham, d. 1903, ed. The Congress of Women: Held in the Woman's Building, World's Columbian Exposition, Chicago, U. S. A., 1893, With Portraits, Biographies and Addresses. Chicago: Monarch Book Company, 1894.
 Elliott, Maud Howe, 1854–1948, ed. Art and Handicraft in the Woman's Building of the World's Columbian Exposition, Chicago, 1893. Chicago and New York: Rand, McNally and Co., 1894.
Green, Christopher T. "A Stage Set for Assimilation: The Model Indian School at the World’s Columbian Exposition". Winterthur Portfolio. Volume 51, Number 2/3 (Summer/Autumn 2017).
 Glimpses of the World's Fair: A Selection of Gems of the White City Seen Through A Camera, Laird & Lee Publishers, Chicago: 1893, accessed February 13, 2009.
International Congress of Mathematicians, Mathematical papers read at the International Mathematical Congress : held in connection with the World's Columbian exposition, Chicago, 1893 (1st : 1893 : Chicago, Ill.).
Jaegerová, Anna. Ideals of Authenticity: Euro-American Sculptural Representations of Native Americans at the World’s Columbian Exposition of 1893. Diploma thesis. July 8, 2021. Masaryk University, Faculty of Arts.
 Larson, Erik. Devil in the White City: Murder, Magic, and Madness at the Fair That Changed America. New York: Crown, 2003. .
 Ormos, István: Cairo in Chicago : Cairo street at the world's Columbian exposition of 1893, Le Caire : Institut Francais d'Archéologie Orientale (IFAO), 2021; 
 Photographs of the World's Fair: an elaborate collection of photographs of the buildings, grounds and exhibits of the World's Columbian Exposition with a special description of The Famous Midway Plaisance. Chicago: Werner, 1894.
 Peck, Richard, Fair Weather, an adventure novel about a 13-year-old being away from home for the first time and visiting the fair.
 Reed, Christopher Robert. "All the World Is Here!" The Black Presence at White City.  Bloomington: Indiana University Press, 2000.  
 Rydell, Robert, and Carolyn Kinder Carr, eds. Revisiting the White City: American Art at the 1893 World's Fair.  Washington, D.C.: Smithsonian Institution, 1993.  
 Wells, Ida B.  The Reason Why the Colored American Is Not in the World's Columbian Exposition: The Afro-American's Contribution to Columbian Literature.  Originally published 1893.  Reprint ed., edited by Robert W. Rydell.  Champaign: University of Illinois Press, 1999.  
 World's Columbian Exposition (1893 : Chicago, Ill.). Board of Lady Managers. List of Books Sent by Home and Foreign Committees to the Library of the Woman's Building, World's Columbian Exposition, Chicago, 1893 by World's Columbian Exposition (1893 : Chicago, Ill.). Board of Lady Managers; edited by Edith E. Clarke. Chicago: n. pub., ca. 1894. A bibliography.
 Yandell, Enid. Three Girls in a Flat by Enid Yandell, Jean Loughborough and Laura Hayes. Chicago: Bright, Leonard and Co., 1892. Biographical account of women at the fair.

External links 

Expo 1893 Chicago at Bureau International des Expositions
 The 1893 World's Fair in Chicago (worldsfairchicago1893.com). A standalone website that covers all aspects of the Exposition
 Chicago 1893 is a media project about the Exposition which includes a book, film, and augmented reality
 The Columbian Exposition in American culture.
 Photographs of the 1893 Columbian Exposition 
 Photographs of the 1893 Columbian Exposition from Illinois Institute of Technology
 Interactive map of Columbian Exposition
 The Story of the Columbian Expo Battleship Illinois Bell
President Benjamin Harrison: Celebrating the 400th Anniversary of the Discovery of America Shapell Manuscript Foundation
 The 1893 World's Columbian Exposition Reading Room. 
 Robert N. Dennis Collection of Stereoscopic Views: Exhibitions 1893. Search results, at New York Public Library Digital Collections
 The Winterthur Library Overview of an archival collection on the World's Columbian Exposition.
 Columbian Theatre History and information about artwork from the U.S. Government Building.
 Photographs and interactive map from the 1893 Columbian Exposition from the University of Chicago
 Video simulations from the 1893 Columbian Exposition from UCLA's Urban Simulation Team 
 1893 Columbian Exposition Concerts
 Edgar Rice Burroughs' Amazing Summer of '93 – Columbian Exposition
 International Eisteddfod chair, Chicago, 1893
 Photographs of the Exposition from the Hagley Digital Archives
 Map of Chicago Columbian Exposition from the American Geographical Society Library
 Interactive Map of the Chicago Columbian Exposition, created in the Harvard Worldmap Platform
President Harrison: Worlds Columbian Exposition Shapell Manuscript Foundation
Guide to the World's Columbian Exposition Ticket Collection, 1893, Special Collections Research Center, Estelle and Melvin Gelman Library, The George Washington University 
Guide to World's Columbian Exposition resources at Field Museum Library
Guide to the World's Columbian Exposition Records 1891-1930 at the University of Chicago Special Collections Research Center

 
World's fairs in Chicago
Architecture in Chicago
1890s architecture in the United States
1893 in the United States
South Side, Chicago
Mesoamerican art exhibitions
Pre-Columbian art exhibitions
Beaux-Arts architecture in Illinois
Festivals established in 1893
1890s in Chicago
1893 in Illinois